Castle Hotel may refer to:
 Castle Hotel, Aberaeron, Wales
 Castle Hotel, Conwy, Wales
 Castle Hotel, Halton, England
 Castle Hotel, Ruthin, Wales
 Castle Hotel, Taunton, England
 Castle Hotel, York, Western Australia
Castle Hotel & Spa, Tarrytown, New York, USA